The Pawhuska Huskers were a Western Association baseball team based in Pawhuska, Oklahoma United States that played from 1920 to 1921. Over the course of their two-year existence, only one known major league player played for them: Rudy Hulswitt. He also managed them in 1921.

References

Baseball teams established in 1920
Defunct minor league baseball teams
Professional baseball teams in Oklahoma
Defunct baseball teams in Oklahoma
Defunct Western Association teams
Baseball teams disestablished in 1921
Osage County, Oklahoma
1920 establishments in Oklahoma
1921 disestablishments in Oklahoma